Zeenat Khan (born 19 November 1951), better known as Zeenat Aman, is an Indian actress and former fashion model. She first received recognition for her modelling work, and at the age of 19, went on to participate in beauty pageants, winning both the Femina Miss India pageant and the Miss Asia Pacific International pageant in 1970. She began acting in 1970, and her early works included the films The Evil Within (1970) and Hulchul (1971). Aman's breakthrough came with the film Hare Rama Hare Krishna (1971), for which she won the Filmfare Best Supporting Actress Award and the BFJA Award for Best Actress. She next acted in the film Yaadon Ki Baaraat (1973), for which she received further recognition.

Aman established herself as a leading actress in the seventies with  prominent roles in Roti Kapada Aur Makaan (1974), Ajanabee (1974), Warrant (1975), Chori Mera Kaam (1975), Dharam Veer (1977), Chhailla Babu (1977), Hum Kisise Kum Naheen (1977), and The Great Gambler (1979). For her role in the 1978 film Satyam Shivam Sundaram, she was nominated for the Filmfare Award for Best Actress. She also acted in Don (1978), a film which spawned the Don franchise. In the early 1980s, she had leading roles in Abdullah (1980), Alibaba Aur 40 Chor (1980), Qurbani (1980), Dostana (1980), and Insaf Ka Tarazu (1980), the latter of which Aman received another nomination for the Filmfare Award for Best Actress. She continued acting in films throughout the 1980s, having roles in the films Laawaris (1981), Mahaan (1983), Pukar (1983), Jagir (1984), and also had roles in the films Teesri Aankh (1982), Hum Se Hai Zamana (1983).

Following her marriage to actor Mazhar Khan in 1985, Aman began appearing less frequently in films and took a hiatus in 1989, her last film for that period being Gawaahi (1989). In 1999, Aman made a comeback to acting, appearing in the film Bhopal Express; she did not continue acting until 2003, appearing in the film Boom, and has since had roles in various independent films, including Ugly Aur Pagli (2008), Dunno Y... Na Jaane Kyon (2010), Chaurahen (2012), Strings of Passion (2014), Dunno Y2... Life Is a Moment (2015), Dil Toh Deewana Hai (2016), and Sallu Ki Shaadi (2017). She also made a cameo in Panipat (2019), and will next appear in a starring role in the upcoming film Margaon: The Closed File (TBA), her first leading role since the 1980s.

Aside from acting, Aman made her theatre debut in 2004, appearing in the play The Graduate in Mumbai, and in 2020 it was announced she will appear in a play based on Kasturba Gandhi. She also led the 2017 web series Love Life & Screw Ups, for which she was praised. Her personal life and experiences with abuse have received extensive media coverage.

Early life
Zeenat Aman was born as Zeenat Khan in Bombay on 19 November 1951. Born to a Muslim father and a Maharashtrian Brahmin mother  Vardhini Karvaste, Aman is the cousin of actor Raza Murad and niece of actor Murad. Her father, Amanullah Khan, was a screenwriter for movies such as Mughal-e-Azam and Pakeezah, and often wrote under the nom de plume "Aman", which she later adopted as her screen name.

Aman's parents got divorced when she was young. At the age of 13, her father passed away. She completed her schooling in Panchgani and attended  University of Southern California in Los Angeles for further studies on student aid, but she could not complete her graduation.

Career

1970–1973: Modeling and acting breakthrough 
In 1970, she participated in the Femina Miss India pageant where she came in second place, and was titled the 'First Princess'. Following this, she competed in the Miss Asia Pacific International pageant, which she won, becoming the first Femina Miss India titleholder to win the pageant. After winning her pageants, Aman had begun acting, appearing first in the film The Evil Within alongside Dev Anand, which was commercially unsuccessful. In 1971, Aman appeared in a minor role in O. P. Ralhan’s Hulchul, and in the same year appeared in another film Hungama, which starred Vinod Khanna, Kishore Kumar, Mehmood and Helen; both films were flops at the box-office. Actor and director Dev Anand soon approached Aman to star as Jasbir/Janice in his movie Hare Rama Hare Krishna (1971), an offer given to her after actress Zaheeda denied the role. The film was a critical success, which helped her achieve her breakthrough, and she won the Filmfare Best Supporting Actress Award and the BFJA Award for Best Actress.

In the 1970s, Cine Blitz magazine was launched, with the first issue having with Aman on its cover. In 1973, she starred in Heera Panna yet again appearing alongside Anand, and in Nasir Hussain’s Yaadon Ki Baaraat as Sunita, the heroine to Vijay Arora. The latter film was described by film scholar Kaushik Baumik as "the first quintessential Bollywood film". Aman's performance in the song "Churaliya hai tumne jo dil ko" garnered attention, where she then became known at the time as the "girl in white carrying a guitar". She also starred in Dhund alongside Sanjay Khan and Danny Denzongpa; its plot was inspired by the Agatha Christie novel The Unexpected Guest. The cast's performance was praised, and the film was a moderate grosser.

1974–1979: Rise to prominence 
In 1974, Aman began the year starring in Manoj Kumar's film Roti Kapda Aur Makaan, where she portrayed Sheetal, an opportunist who deserts her jobless lover for a millionaire. Aman had continued to star alongside Dev Anand throughout the year, appearing together in Prem Shastra and Ishq Ishq Ishq. She had a role as Nisha, a recovering prostitute in the Shammi Kapoor directed film Manoranjan, and starred in Ajanabee as Rashmi, an ambitious girl who considers having an abortion in order to pursue a career; the latter film had an average performance at the box office. In 1975, Aman appeared in two films: she starred in the films Warrant as an assassin, and Chori Mera Kaam as Sharmali, both of which were successful.

Aman appeared in Deewaangee alongside Shashi Kapoor, and had an uncredited voice role in Balika Badhu. In 1977, she starred in the movie Dharam Veer alongside Dharmendra, Jeetendra, and Neetu Singh as a princess. The film was the second highest-grossing Hindi film of that year. She had roles in the films Darling Darling, which was again portrayed alongside Dev Anand, and in the film Chhailla Babu which was a commercial success. Aman next starred in the film Hum Kisise Kum Naheen as Sunita, the lover of Rishi Kapoor, which was the third highest-grossing Hindi film of the year. Aman next attempted to make an entry into Hollywood, with Krishna Shah's film Shalimar, which proved unsuccessful in both the United States and in India. She next starred in Heeralaal Pannalal as well as starring in Chor Ke Ghar Chor, again starring in the latter film with Ashok Kumar.

Aman appeared in Raj Kapoor's film Satyam Shivam Sundaram (1978), for which she influenced Kapoor to let her audition, describing the story to Cinestaan: "When I knocked on the door and he [Kapoor] asked who it was, I replied, 'Your future heroine'. I think he was touched by my dedication and determination to act in his film. The film was a box-office success, however initially drew controversy from critics, with many describing the plot as counter-intuitive; the subject dealt with the "soul being more attractive than the body" though Kapoor showcased Aman's sex-appeal. Aman's performance earned her a Filmfare nomination for Best Actress. Also in 1978, Aman originated the role of Roma in the film Don. The producer of the film, Nariman Irani, had been losing money at the time, which led the actress to take the role in order to help Irani, having known him beforehand and refused payment for her work; Irani died midway through filming. The film was released to significant commercial success, and inspired the Don franchise, where Aman's character has been portrayed by Priyanka Chopra.

In 1979, Aman starred as Shabnam in The Great Gambler. She described her work experience on the film as one of her favorites, particularly when they filmed in Italy. When released, it became a sleeper hit. Her last role that year was a guest appearance in the film Gol Maal.

1980–1984: Blockbusters and continued success 
In 1980, Aman first had roles in the films Takkar as Sapna, and Ram Balram as Madhu. She also starred as Radha alongside Vinod Khanna in Bombay 405 Miles. Aman next starred as Zainab in the Sanjay Khan directed film Abdullah, starring alongside Raj Kapoor, Danny Denzongpa and Khan himself. The film had one of the highest budgets spent on any film at the time, which was a risk taken by Khan for its success. Despite underperforming in India, the film achieved success in the Soviet Union. Aman next starred as Fatima in the Indian-Soviet produced film Adventures of Ali-Baba and the Forty Thieves, better known as Alibaba Aur 40 Chor, which is one of three film adaptations of the original folk tale, and was also noted for being one of the first movies to cast actors of other nationalities. It was a moderate success, and was one of the more successful Indian-Soviet co-productions.

Aman next starred in the Feroz Khan directed film Qurbani, in which she starred with Khan and Vinod Khanna; she was cast as Sheela, a singer and dancer. The film was a major success at the box-office, and the soundtrack received particular praise. The song Aap Jaisa Koi, which had been sung by Nazia Hassan and picturised on Aman, won a Filmfare Award. Aman also starred as Sheetal in the film Dostana alongside Amitabh Bachchan. She was next cast as a rape victim seeking justice in B. R. Chopra’s Insaaf Ka Tarazu, which was one of few to focus on its storyline rather than its soundtrack. The film earned Aman her second nomination for the Filmfare Best Actress Award. In 1981, Aman appeared in four films - she first starred as Sonia in Professor Pyarelal, as the heroine to Dharmendra, starred in the film Katilon Ke Kaatil as Jamila, and also appeared in the film Krodhi as Neera and led the film Laawaris alongside Amitabh Bachchan.

In 1982, Aman starred in the crime film Ashanti. In 1983, she starred in the film Mahaan as Rita, which was the first to feature a triple-role character. The film turned to be an above-average grosser. In the same year, she starred in the film Pukar as Julie, which had an average performance at the box office. The film has been remade in various recreations, including the 2000 adaptation, which also performed average the box-office. Also in 1983, she starred as Nisha Thakur in the film Hum Se Hai Zamana. In 1984, she starred in Jagir as the main heroine Sima, along Dharmendra, Mithun Chakraborty and Pran.

1985–2009: Hiatus and occasional acting 
From 1985 to 1989, she appeared less frequently in films to focus more on her marriage with Mazhar Khan; her films in this period were critically and financially unsuccessful. She starred in the film Gawahi, a courtroom drama, which would be her last film role before making a temporary retirement from the film industry. After 10 years of being inactive in the industry, Aman appeared in a cameo role in the film Bhopal Express (1999). However, she didn't appear in another film until 2003, when she appeared as Alice in the film Boom. The film turned to drastically under-perform at the box-office, creating a set of financial problems for the film's crew, including the producer Ayesha Shroff.

In 2004, she appeared as Mrs. Robinson in the play The Graduate staged at St Andrew's auditorium in Mumbai. She had also made an appearance along with actress Hema Malini in the talk show Koffee with Karan, hosted by Karan Johar. Aman then had roles in the films Maksham (2005), Jaana... Let's Fall in Love (2006) as Raju's mother, and in Chaurahen which was released in 2012, but had originally been filmed and shelved in 2007. In 2008, Aman guest starred in the feature film Ugly Aur Pagli. In the year following, she starred in the film Geeta in Paradise (2009).

In 2008, Aman received a Lifetime Achievement Award during the Zee Cine Awards function in 2008 as a recognition of her contribution to Hindi Cinema. She also received an "Outstanding Contribution to Indian Cinema" at the IIFA Awards 2010 held at Colombo, Sri Lanka.

2010–present: Expansion and revitalisation 
In 2010, Aman starred as Rebecca in the film Dunno Y... Na Jaane Kyon. The film was originally aired at film festivals nationwide, and drew an immense amount of controversy, being panned by critics for its gay stereotypes. However, the film achieved success through film festivals and later achieved a limited theatrical release. In the film, Aman performed the songs Aap Jaisa Koi and Chura Liya Hai Tumne Jo. It later spawned the sequel Dunno Y2... Life Is a Moment, released in 2014, which Aman had also starred in. In 2012, Aman was cast as Roma in the film Strings of Passion. Aman had roles in the films Dil Toh Deewana Hai (2016) and Sallu Ki Shaadi (2017). Sallu Ki Shaadi was made as a tribute to actor Salman Khan.

In 2017, Aman was cast in the short-lived web series Love Life & Screw Ups, in which she played the main role of Joanna, a spinster with a drastic love life and personal problems, who frequently mingles with younger people. The show was featured in international film festivals, including a film festival in Poland, being the first Indian web series to be shown at a festival there. While the series received generally mixed reviews, Aman's performance was praised by critics. In June 2019, Aman joined the cast of the film Panipat, where she portrayed the minor role of Sakina Begum, a character whom director Ashutosh Gowariker described as "a feisty character leading her province of Hoshiyarganj." It was released theatrically in December 2019, emerging as a box-office failure.

In an interview in September 2019 with Eastern Eye, Aman discussed her activity currently in the film industry, saying that "There are no great age appropriate roles for ladies my age. They are very few and far between in Hindi cinema, so that’s it, but I wouldn’t say no if a really great role came along." In February 2020, it was announced that Aman is staging a comeback in theatre, appearing in a play on Kasturba Gandhi. In January 2021, it was announced that she would star in the upcoming murder-mystery film Margaon: The Closed File, her first leading role since the 1980s. In the film, which is a tribute to Agatha Christie, Aman will portray the "head of an Anglo Indian family who is an independent woman, a mother as well as an entrepreneur."

Personal life 

In 1978, Aman married actor Sanjay Khan, which was annulled in 1979. Aman then married actor Mazhar Khan from 1985 to his death in 1998. With Mazhar Khan, she had two sons: Azaan Khan, a film director who directed the heist film Bankster,  and composer Zahaan Khan. She lives with her sons, since Mazhar's death in 1998. In her marriage with Mazhar, Aman stated she was unhappy. She commented on her marriage with Mazhar Khan in 1999, on the show Rendezvous with Simi Garewal: 
In 1980, Aman was the victim of abuse in an incident where actor Sanjay Khan beat her; she had received a phone call from Khan asking to discuss specifics for the film Abdullah. She met with him at the hotel he'd been staying at for the meeting, where he beat her severely, resulting in many injuries after the incident. This had been witnessed by his wife, who had allegedly cheered him on to keep beating Aman. The incident left Aman with a lazy eye, and she later stated that she pretends it never happened.

In February 2018, Aman filed a rape case against businessman Aman Khanna, better known as Sarfaraz. After stalking, harassing, and robbing Aman, as well as allegedly raping Aman various times, charges were pressed against Khanna in which he was then incarcerated. The incidents described were said to have taken place between 2011 and 2016.

Image and accomplishments 

Aman was initially met controversy with in her acting career for her often sexualization in a number of films, to which some critics and fans believed overshadowed her performances. Commenting on this, she told Hindustan Times: "I don't regret or feel bad about anything that happened or may not have happened. If I lost something, I gained something more. The fact that I can look back at my career with so much pride and happiness means I have had a good run without any complaints." She has since frequently been cited as the original sex symbol of Bollywood, and is notorious for her figure and looks. However, Aman has stated that she does not take the term seriously, and rather felt restricted by it. 

Aman commented on dealing with the media exposure in 2019, saying that "...I haven’t got used to it and feel very blessed. Like I said to you, it is only now I have realised how blessed I am. I see people watching my films and songs as a blessing. There is a wonderful feeling of nostalgia when they see my films and songs. Whenever I am in their city, they reach out to me with that love and I feel very blessed and grateful for the same."

In March 2016, an exhibition created by artist Mina Siddique was launched in Dubai, which featured various works and arts in dedication to Aman, which was titled as Zeenat Aman, with the tagline "Redefining Beauty". The event was attended by Aman herself, as well as members from various countries, including UAE and Pakistan. In April 2019, Bollywood Hungama listed Aman as one of the "10 Hottest Bollywood Actresses Of All Time".

Accolades 
Aman has won one Bengal Film Journalists' Association Award and one Filmfare Award from three nominations.

Honours
2003 - Bollywood Awards "Award for Lifetime Achievement" - Lifetime of Glamour.
 2006 - "Outstanding Contribution to the Motion Picture Industry of India Awards" at the Bollywood Movie Awards.
 2008 - Zee Cine Award for Lifetime Achievement
2010 - "Outstanding Contribution to Indian cinema" at the 11th IIFA Awards
2016 - "Timeless Glamour & Style Icon" at the Filmfare Glamour & Style Awards
2018 - Society Achievers Award - Lifetime Achievement

See also 
 List of Indian film actresses

References

Further reading

External links

 
 

1951 births
Indian film actresses
Living people
St. Xavier's College, Mumbai alumni
Bengal Film Journalists' Association Award winners
Femina Miss India winners
20th-century Indian actresses
21st-century Indian actresses
Actresses in Hindi cinema
Indian beauty pageant winners
University of Southern California alumni
Beauty pageant contestants from India
Female models from Mumbai
Actresses from Mumbai
Miss Asia Pacific International winners
Filmfare Awards winners